The Dawson Brothers Plant is a historic factory building located at 517-519 N. Halsted Street in the West Town community area of Chicago, Illinois. The factory was built in 1888 and designed by Julius Zittel; the five-story brick building has a cast iron front on its first floor and lacks ornamentation. The Dawson Brothers used the factory to produce fireplace mantels and grates; the building also served as the company's showroom and offices. A six-story addition was added to the building in 1901; this addition mainly served as a storage and shipping area. The Dawson Brothers conducted business at the factory until the 1920s. The building was added to the National Register of Historic Places on February 14, 1985.

References

Industrial buildings completed in 1888
Industrial buildings and structures on the National Register of Historic Places in Chicago
Fireplaces